Bloop was an ultra-low-frequency, high amplitude underwater sound detected by the U.S. National Oceanic and Atmospheric Administration (NOAA) in 1997. By 2012, earlier speculation that the sound originated from a marine animal was replaced by NOAA's description of the sound as being consistent with noises generated via non-tectonic cryoseisms originating from glacial movements such as ice calving, or through seabed gouging by ice.

Sound profile 
The sound was detected by the Equatorial Pacific Ocean autonomous hydrophone array, a system of hydrophones primarily used to monitor undersea seismicity, ice noise, and marine mammal population and migration. This is a stand-alone system designed and built by NOAA's Pacific Marine Environmental Laboratory (PMEL) to augment NOAA's use of the U.S. Navy Sound Surveillance System (SOSUS), which was equipment originally designed to detect Soviet submarines.

Ice quake origin
The NOAA Vents Program has attributed the sound to that of a large cryoseism (also known as an ice quake). Numerous ice quakes share similar spectrograms with Bloop, as well as the amplitude necessary to detect them despite ranges exceeding 5000 km. This was found during the tracking of iceberg A53a as it disintegrated near South Georgia Island in early 2008. The iceberg(s) involved in generating the sound were most likely between Bransfield Straits and the Ross Sea; or possibly at Cape Adare, a well-known source of cryogenic signals. Sounds generated by ice quakes are easily determined through the use of hydrophones since sea water, an excellent sound channel, allows the ambient sounds generated through ice activities to travel great distances.

Ice calving
In ice calving, variations result from a sound source's own motion. As oceanographer Yunbo Xie explains, the alteration of waveforms from a detected sound "can also be caused by so-called angular frequency dependent radiation patterns associated with antisymmetric mode motion of the ice cover."

Rubbing and ridging events within an ice floe
Two processes known as rubbing and ridging are responsible for acoustical emissions similar to those from ice calving. Rubbing involves two or more areas of compacted glacial ice floes which are being forced together, inducing shear deformation at its edges and triggering horizontally-polarized shear waves, i. e. SH waves. Ridging occurs when that ice bends or slides at the ridges. According to Xie, both events will produce sound in the failure sequence (breakup) of an ice floe:

Animal origin
NOAA's Christopher Fox, in an interview with CNN in 2001, stated that he believed Bloop to be ice calving in Antarctica. In 2002 Fox was interviewed by David Wolman for an article in New Scientist, where he stated that he did not believe its origin was man-made, such as a submarine or bomb. Fox also stated that while the audio profile of Bloop does resemble that of a living creature, the source was a mystery because it would be "far more powerful than the calls made by any animal on Earth." Wolman reported In his article the following:

According to author Philip Hayward, Wolman's speculations "amplified Fox's 'hunch' and—through the use of the word 'likely'—opened the door for subsequent speculation as to what such an 'efficient' noise-making entity might be. Over the last decade consensus has, in fact, supported the argument that the noise is produced by ice fracturing processes."

In popular culture 

	
 A 2012 American made-for-TV thriller produced for Animal Planet and Discovery Channel in the form of a documentary titled Mermaids: The Body Found suggested the Bloop sound was evidence for the existence of mermaids or an unknown species in the oceans. NOAA posted a refutation on their web site.
	
 The comic book Atomic Robo had Robo investigate the source of the Bloop for the NOAA in a deep sea submersible.

See also
 List of formerly unidentified sounds

References

External links 
 NOAA's PMEL Acoustics Program on Icequakes (Bloop)
 
 

1997 in science
Pacific Ocean
Snow or ice weather phenomena
Oceanography
Unidentified sounds